Chemrey Monastery or Chemrey Gompa is a 1664 Buddhist monastery, approximately  east of Leh, Ladakh, northern India. It belongs to the Drugpa monastic order. It was founded in 1664 by the Lama Tagsang Raschen and dedicated to King Sengge Namgyal.

The monastery has a notable high Padmasambhava statue. It also contains a valuable collection of scriptures

The monastery comprises a number of shrines, two assembly halls (Du-Khang) and a Lama temple (Lha-Khang). The main attraction of the monastery is the one storey high statue of Padmasambhava. Another big attraction is the 29 volume scripture written in silver and golden letters.
The monastery holds every year the Chemrey Angchok festival of sacred dances.

Gallery

References

Buddhist monasteries in Ladakh
Drukpa Kagyu monasteries and temples
Religious buildings and structures completed in 1664
1664 establishments in Asia